Marriott is a hamlet in the Rural Municipality of Marriott No. 317, Saskatchewan, Canada. The hamlet is located south of the Town of Biggar and north of the Town of Rosetown at the intersection of Highway 4 & Highway 768.
Actual location is closer to 51.45'54"N 107.45"09"W. This location is actually known as "Howard Powell" (Howard Powell school is still
located to the West of this junction).

See also

 List of communities in Saskatchewan
 Hamlets of Saskatchewan

Marriott No. 317, Saskatchewan
Unincorporated communities in Saskatchewan